The following Confederate States Army units and commanders fought in the July 11, 1864 Battle of Fort Stevens during the American Civil War. The Union order of battle is listed separately.

Abbreviations used

Military rank
 LTG = Lieutenant General
 MG = Major General
 BG = Brigadier General
 Col = Colonel
 Ltc = Lieutenant Colonel
 Maj = Major

Army of the Valley District

LTG Jubal Early

Second Corps, Army of Northern Virginia

Breckinridge's Corps
MG John C. Breckinridge

Other

Sources
 Cooling,  Benjamin F. Jubal Early's Raid on Washington 1864. Baltimore, Maryland: The Nautical & Aviation Publishing Company of America, 1989. 

American Civil War orders of battle
Valley campaigns of 1864